When Romance Meets Destiny (lit. "Gwang-sik's  Younger Brother Gwang-tae") is a 2005 South Korean romantic comedy about two brothers and their different approaches to love.

Plot 
Gwang-sik has never been particularly good at talking to women. While a university student, he fell hard for a woman named Yun-kyung, but circumstances and his lack of nerve prevented him from ever getting close to her, despite the fact that she seemed to be interested in him. Years later Gwang-sik, who now has a small photography studio with his assistant Il-woong, runs into Yun-kyung again. But has anything really changed in him?

Gwang-sik has a younger brother, Gwang-tae. Gwang-tae experiences none of the problems that plague his brother. For him, picking up women is almost an unconscious habit. Getting them into bed is a piece of cake. Disposing of them afterwards is no less simple, excepting the times when they track him down and throw rocks through his window. One day, however, he meets a woman named Kyung-jae who is just a little too smart, too attractive, and too mature for him to handle. Suddenly, he feels just as confused about relationships as his brother Gwang-sik.

Cast 
 Kim Joo-hyuk as Yu Gwang-sik
 Bong Tae-gyu as Yu Gwang-tae
 Lee Yo-won as Ko Yun-kyung
 Kim Ah-joong as Lee Kyung-jae
 Jung Kyung-ho as Kim Il-woong 
 Kim Hyung-min as Bae Ui-dong
 Kim Il-woong as Kang Myung-chan
 Park Chul-min as bartender
 Lee Dae-yeon as doctor
 Ha Ji-young as Supporting

References

External links 
  
 
 
 

2005 films
2000s Korean-language films
South Korean romantic comedy films
2005 romantic comedy films
2000s South Korean films
Myung Films films